The Arado Ar 198 was a prototype reconnaissance aircraft, developed by Arado Flugzeugwerke, with backing from the Luftwaffe, who initially preferred it over the Blohm & Voss BV 141 and the Focke-Wulf Fw 189. However, when flight tests were carried out the aircraft performed poorly, and did not impress the Luftwaffe. One aircraft was completed in 1938.

Design and development

In 1936 the RLM issued a specification for a new aircraft that would specialize in short-range reconnaissance, with special emphasis placed on ground vision. Arado, Blohm & Voss (Hamburger Flugzeugbau Division), Focke- Wulf, and Henschel all had experience with this specific type aircraft and started work immediately.

The Ar 198 was to be built around a three-man crew, consisting of a  pilot, gunner/radio operator, and observer. Both the pilot and gunner/radio operator positions were above the wing, while the observer's area was below the wing, in a well laid out fuselage that offered good communication between the crew members.

Built using a shoulder wing configuration, giving the pilot unrestricted forward visibility, the Ar 198 was of steel tube construction for the forward fuselage structure with all-metal monocoque construction of the tailboom.

An air-cooled radial BMW 132 engine was initially chosen, but due to availability concerns, the first prototype was fitted with the slightly lower-powered Bramo 323 A-1 of the Brandenburgische Motorenwerke.

Operational history

In early March 1938, the Ar 198 made its first flight from the factory airfield at Warnemünde. Following flights proved generally satisfactory, except for instability in all axes during low speed flight. Automatic slats were fitted with noticeable improvement, but It was still a difficult craft to handle.

Basic poor performance and concerns about insufficient production capacity led the Technical Office to terminate development of the Arado Ar 198 in the latter months of 1938.

Specifications

References

 Green, William. Warplanes of the Third Reich. New York:Doubleday, 1972. .
 Wagner, Ray and Nowarra, Heinz. German Combat Planes: A Comprehensive Survey and History of the Development of German Military Aircraft from 1914 to 1945. New York: Doubleday, 1971.

Abandoned military aircraft projects of Germany
Ar 198
1930s German military reconnaissance aircraft
Single-engined tractor aircraft
High-wing aircraft
Aircraft first flown in 1938